Blue Mound is a summit in Vernon County in the U.S. state of Missouri.

Variant names were "Blue Mounds" and "Twin Mounds". The summit was named for its characteristic bluish hue when viewed from afar.

References

Landforms of Vernon County, Missouri
Mountains of Missouri